Köprülü Canyon is a canyon and a National Park in the Province of Antalya, Turkey.

There are fish restaurants at the rest area; fresh trout is a specialty. The Roman Oluklu Bridge (Olukluköprü) over a tributary gorge and the Bugrum Bridge over the Kocadere stream were engineering feats of their time.

Getting there
Northeast of Antalya on the Side road, take the turnoff for Taşağıl and Beşkonak to reach Köprülü Canyon National Park. A circular scenic route criss-crosses, passing through extensive forests and over waterfalls.

References

External links

 https://web.archive.org/web/20130626072635/http://www.antalya-ws.com/english/nparks/koprulu.asp Pictures of the Canyon
 http://www.antalya-rafting.net/antalya-rafting-tour.asp Rafting Activities in Koprulu Canyon 
 http://www.tourantalya.com/how-to-go/?place=koprulu-canyon-national-park How to go to Koprulu Canyon

Canyons and gorges of Turkey
Landforms of Antalya Province
National parks of Turkey
Protected areas established in 1973
Tourist attractions in Antalya Province